Mystery Case Files is a video game series originally developed by the internal studios of Big Fish Games. Some installments were developed by Eipix Entertainment between 2015 and 2019 and Elephant Games who developed sequels from 2013 to 2014. The newest installments were developed by GrandMA Studios. The Mystery Case Files series is known for its hidden object puzzles where, in order to progress through a game, the player plays the role of a Master Detective and must find a certain number of items hidden somewhere on a painted scene.

In 2007, Big Fish Games estimated that "100 million people have at least sampled trial versions" of the Mystery Case Files games since the initial launch of Mystery Case Files: Huntsville.

The latest installment in the series, Mystery Case Files: The Dalimar Legacy, was released on March 16, 2023, and is the 25th game in the series.

Gameplay
Mystery Case Files: Huntsville marked the introduction of the hidden object game – a genre of casual game development in which a player must locate a list of objects which are hidden among many other objects on the computer screen. Once a player has located all the listed hidden objects, they progress on to the next area of gameplay. In case a player is unable to find a required object, many hidden object games offer a finite number of hints.

Like all Mystery Case Files titles, Huntsville relies heavily on hidden object gameplay. Upon completing each hidden object puzzle, players return to their Crime Computer where they solve subsequent puzzles in order to gather evidence and help pinpoint the thief. A player is given a limited amount of time to complete each puzzle. If the player fails to successfully complete a puzzle in this time, they must begin again with an entirely new scenario.

Prime Suspects relies heavily on hidden object gameplay as well, but introduces a new device that will only work if the player finds batteries in any hidden object scene. The device enables the player to see through walls to find the hidden object. The player has to gather evidence in a limited amount of time and deduce which suspect is mostly likely to have stolen the Queen's Hope Diamond.

Ravenhearst allows the player to gather the missing pages of Emma's diary by relying heavily on hidden object scenes. Puzzles are introduced to the gameplay as players must solve them to unlock each door in the manor in order to access the locked rooms. At the end of the game, keys must be found all around the manor in order to free Emma's soul from the mansion.

Games

Huntsville (2005)
Mystery Case Files: Huntsville is the first installment in the Mystery Case Files franchise and was released in November 2005. The player takes the role of a master detective to solve a series of seemingly random crimes in the small town of Huntsville. The game features a number of locations to explore and introduced the Crime Computer which is still a main part of the series. As the levels progressed, the detective discovers that the apprehended criminals are associated with a special organization called S.T.A.I.N. Every member of the organization has a trademark, all the members have a tattoo of a Skeleted Head tattooed at any part of their body or placed in items. All of them have different styles of Smulge such as Handwork Building, Scratch Folk, Thievery and more.

Following its release on November 18, 2005, Mystery Case Files: Huntsville broke all previous casual game sales records by over 100%, selling over $1 million worth of digitally distributed (downloaded) copies in under three months. As a result, it moved into the top 10 sales positions on all major casual game distribution websites.

It was initially released as an online game download for the PC and soon after for the Mac OS. In July 2006, Big Fish Games signed an agreement with Activision Value to distribute the game beginning in September 2006 at retail locations throughout the United States.

Prime Suspects (2006)
Mystery Case Files: Prime Suspects is the second installment in the Mystery Case Files franchise and was released in April 2006. The player is tasked with investigating the disappearance of the Queen's Hope Diamond in Capital City. Mystery Case Files: Prime Suspects added items that players have to discover to unlock later levels (such as finding a battery to power a flashlight). Characters also became a more prominent part of the series with the investigation revolving around multiple characters with different persons.

Gamezebo.com noted the game had good art, story and replayability, but that later levels were repetitive and difficulty did not increase.

Ravenhearst (2006)
Mystery Case Files: Ravenhearst is the third installment in the Mystery Case Files franchise, was released in December 2006 and features an investigation centered on a mysterious manor located in England. Players find objects to unlock diary pieces to follow the life of Emma Ravenhearst, in the year 1894 in Blackpool. Through the diary entries, the player learns how Emma travelled from America to England to be a teacher, became involved with a man called Charles Dalimar, but refused his marriage proposal; Charles then began to secretly poison Emma and intercept her family's mail to keep her from leaving England. The final diary entry addresses the player directly and directs them to a locked door in the basement, behind which they find Emma's corpse in a coffin, with her soul being released now that the mystery of her disappearance is solved.

Mystery Case Files: Ravenhearst introduced elaborate door puzzles to the series that were similar to a Rube Goldberg-type puzzle. Mystery Case Files: Ravenhearst was re-released for the Nintendo DS in April 2013. Ravenhearst was "the third-best-selling PC title in the United States for the week ending in the annual Black Friday shopping splurge" selling 100,000 copies in six weeks.

Madame Fate (2007)
Mystery Case Files: Madame Fate is the fourth installment in the Mystery Case Files franchise and was released in November 2007. The player investigates Madame Fate's Carnival and the carnival workers to see which one of them causes the fortune teller's death at midnight. Madame Fate has equal suspicion - and contempt - towards the people who run other attractions at the carnival, but as the player investigates, they find that all of them are also doomed to die at midnight. As midnight strikes, just as Madame Fate is about to find out the player's fate, she is indeed killed by a malevolent spirit; the Queen then contacts the player to let them know it was the spirit of Charles from Ravenhearst Manor, furious that the player has released Emma's spirit.

Mystery Case Files: Madame Fate introduces more types of puzzles (including word puzzles and multiple crystal ball puzzles) while also changing the way a player can find items. Sometimes the player must combine two items on the screen, other times they must locate hidden areas to progress. The bulk of the game is still finding hidden objects, but there are a lot of other types of puzzles. The game also introduces morphing objects that players must find in each scene to unlock 3 secret areas that are located in the carnival. Mystery Case Files: Madame Fate also introduced hidden object scenes inside hidden object scenes into the gameplay.

Return to Ravenhearst (2008)
Mystery Case Files: Return to Ravenhearst is the fifth installment in the Mystery Case Files franchise and was released on November 26, 2008, for Big Fish Games Game Club members whereas the public was able to download this game on November 27, 2008. This game is the second installment in the Ravenhearst story arc. After Madame Fate's death, the player returns to Ravenhearst Manor to solve Charles' mystery; they discover that the spirits of Rose, Emma's housekeeper, and Gwendolyn and Charlotte, Rose's children, are still trapped in the manor. The player is then subdued by Victor, Charles' still living son, who is responsible for keeping Charles's spirit alive using a machine in the basement. When the player tampers with the machine, it catches fire and burns the manor down, destroying Charles' spirit and reuniting the ghosts of Emma, Rose, and the two girls, with Victor escaping through a time machine back to 1895.

In addition to the hidden object scenes, which were characteristic for the first title of the Ravenhearst series, the publishers have "added a graphic adventure component that allows players to explore and interact with the world of Ravenhearst like never before." It is now possible to move through the Ravenhearst manor, the surrounding estate and collected items interact with the environment. Puzzles and hidden object scenes are integrated into the different locations throughout the game. These scenes are tagged with frequent twinkles to attract the player's interest. Return to Ravenhearst is the first installment of the Mystery Case Files series where "haunting performances from live actors" are used.

Dire Grove (2009)
Mystery Case Files: Dire Grove is the sixth installment of the Mystery Case Files franchise and was released December 11, 2009. It had its first release on November 25, 2009, as a Collector's Edition. It follows the events of four graduate students led by Alison Sterling (Davie-Blue Bacich) who travel to a small township near Blackpool, England. The game follows on from the previous game, Return to Ravenhearst, but does not directly lead into the Ravenhearst story arc.

Mystery Case Files: Dire Grove received mostly positive reviews. It has a Metacritic score of 82 and a GameRankings score of 75.00%.

13th Skull (2010)
Mystery Case Files: 13th Skull is the seventh installment of the Mystery Case Files franchise and had its first release on November 25, 2010, as a Collector's Edition. It follows the disappearance of Marcus Lawson after moving into a creepy mansion in Louisiana. His daughter, Magnolia, believes her father was kidnapped by the ghost of a vengeful pirate seeking to protect his lost fortune.

IGN reviewed 13th Skull as "Good" with a 7.0 rating for its presentation, gameplay, graphics, sound and lasting appeal for 6.5 to 7.5 per category.

Escape From Ravenhearst (2011)
Mystery Case Files: Escape From Ravenhearst is the eighth installment of the Mystery Case Files franchise and was released November 23, 2011 as a Collector's Edition. Some residents in Blackpool, England have gone missing around Ravenhearst Manor and the player, the Master Detective must return to the fire-ravaged manor and search for the missing residents. This game is the third installment in the Ravenhearst story arc.

Shadow Lake (2012)
Mystery Case Files: Shadow Lake is the ninth installment of the Mystery Case Files franchise and was the last to be released by Big Fish Studios. Shadow Lake was released on November 20, 2012, and features actress Lea Thompson as Cassandra Williams, a psychic medium who helps the Master Detective solve puzzles while they investigate the mysterious destruction of a ghost town.

GameZebo gave it a 4 out of 5 rating.

Fate's Carnival (2013)
Mystery Case Files: Fate's Carnival is the tenth installment of the Mystery Case Files franchise and the first to be released by developer Elephant Games. Fate's Carnival was released on November 26, 2013, and returns the player to Madame Fate's carnival, previously featured in the series' fourth installment, Madame Fate. Exploring the carnival vicinity with the help of Isis the cat, the game incorporates characters featured in previous games, as well as introducing new ones.

All About Casual Game gave it a 4.5 out of 5 rating, lauding "Fate's Carnival is one remarkable carnival experience that you will not forget". Voted the "Talk of the Town" game by All About Casual Game readers for the Best of 2013 awards event.

Dire Grove, Sacred Grove (2014)
Mystery Case Files: Dire Grove, Sacred Grove is the eleventh installment of the Mystery Case Files franchise and was the last to be released by developer Elephant Games. Dire Grove, Sacred Grove was released on November 26, 2014, and returns the player to the fictional township of Dire Grove, previously explored in the sixth installment of the same name.

All About Casual Game gave it a 4.5 out of 5 rating, saying the game is "a contender for the best game of the year" and awarding it an "Editor's Choice" distinction.

Key to Ravenhearst (2015)
Mystery Case Files: Key to Ravenhearst is the twelfth installment of the Mystery Case Files franchise and is the first to be developed by Eipix Entertainment. Key to Ravenhearst was released on October 27, 2015. Key to Ravenhearst is the fourth installment in the Ravenhearst story arc.

Gamezebo: 4.5/5 
All About Casual Game: 4.5/5

Ravenhearst Unlocked (2015)

Mystery Case Files: Ravenhearst Unlocked is the thirteenth game in the casual adventure game series and published by Big Fish Games. Released on November 27, 2015, it is the second game in the series to be developed by Eipix Entertainment. The mode is single-player and the platforms include Windows, Mac OS X, iOS and Android. It is the final part of the Ravenhearst storyline.

Gamezebo: 4.5/5 All About Casual Game: 5/5

Broken Hour (2016)
Mystery Case Files: Broken Hour is the fourteenth installment of the series. The Beta for the game was released on March 7, 2016. The Collector's Edition was released on 22 November 2016. The Master Detective is sent by the Queen to the Huxley's Boarding House to search for George Pritchard, royal photographer and a friend of Her Majesty before time runs out.

All About Casual Game gave a full 5 out of 5 rating, saying the game is "complex, stunning, and compelling; just all-around sensational" and awarding it an "Editor's Choice" distinction  Voted the "Talk of the Town" game by All About Casual Game readers for the Best of 2016 awards event.

The Black Veil (2016)
Mystery Case Files: The Black Veil is the fifteenth installment of the series. The Beta was released on December 22, 2016. The Collector's Edition was released on 23 March 2017. The story was set in Dreadmond, a town in Scotland where people were mysteriously suffering from rapid aging. It is the first appearance since Mystery Case Files: Dire Grove of Alison Sterling (voiced by Katie Leigh).

All About Casual Game gave a 4.5 out of 5 rating. Voted the "Best Adventure Game" by All About Casual Game readers for the Best of 2017 awards event.

The Revenant's Hunt (2017)
Mystery Case Files: The Revenant's Hunt is 16th installment of the series. The Beta version of the game was released in July 2017. The story follows a murder victim rising from the grave to bring justice to his killers, and possibly one of his own descendants. The Collector's Edition was released on 20 November 2017.

All About Casual Game gave a 4 out of 5 rating, commenting that it was slightly disappointing for the fans.

Rewind (2018)
Mystery Case Files: Rewind is the 17th installment of the series. The Beta version was released in March 2018. The gameplay of the game is based on the first four games of the series in basic hidden objects gameplay instead of point-and-click adventure gameplay as all the games since Return to Ravenhearst. The story mixes many of the previous games' characters in a time paradox. The game was released on June 21, 2018, as the Collector's Edition version.

All About Casual Game gave a 4 out of 5 rating, saying that it was "an enjoyable trip down the memory lane".

The Countess (2018)
Mystery Case Files: The Countess is the 18th installment of the series. The story follows Lady Eleanor Codington, a friend of the Master Detective who went missing as she reclaimed her family estate. The Codington manor was said to have been a host of an ancient evil, known as the Shade, and the Master Detective has to not only find her friend, but also free the manor of an ancient curse.

All About Casual Game gave a 4 out of 5 rating, saying that it was "exciting haunted house adventure" even though it lacked complexity.

Moths to a Flame (2019)
Mystery Case Files: Moths to a Flame is the 19th installment of the series. The Master Detective is sent to the Zenith Museum of Oddities to investigate missing MCF agents.

All About Casual Game gave a 5 out of 5 rating, commenting that the game "is one of the franchise's...most complex and most all-around impressive titles to date."

Black Crown (2019)
Mystery Case Files: Black Crown  is the 20th installment of the series and the last one made by Eipix Entertainment. It's a sequel to the 13th Skull game. The game was released on Nov 28th, 2019.

The Harbinger (2020)
Mystery Case Files: The Harbinger is the 21st installment of the series and the first one made by GrandMA Studios. The game was released in Aug 20, 2020. After completing Bonus chapter, there is a cut-scene featuring Charles Dalimar and a title named "Crossfade"

Crossfade (2020)
Completing the Bonus Chapter in The Harbinger reveals a short cutscene, revealing a potential title for the next game in the series, perhaps continuing on the Ravenhearst story. Crossfade is the 22nd installment of the series and was released on November 25, 2020.

Incident at Pendle Tower (2021)
Mystery Case Files: Incident at Pendle Tower is the 23rd installment of the series. The game was released on November 23, 2021.

The Last Resort (2022)
Mystery Case Files: The Last Resort is the 24th installment of the series. The full version was released on November 22nd, 2022.

The Dalimar Legacy (2023)
Mystery Case Files: The Dalimar Legacy is the 25th installment of the series. The full version was released on March 16, 2023.

Spin-off Games

Agent X (2008)
Mystery Case Files: Agent X was released on April 14, 2008, and is the first title in the Mystery Case Files franchise to be released for a portable device. Mystery Case Files: Agent X is only usable by Glu Mobile capable-cellphones.

MillionHeir (2008)
Mystery Case Files: MillionHeir was released on September 8, 2008, and is the second game in the Mystery Case Files franchise to be released for a portable device. Mystery Case Files: MillionHeir requires a Nintendo DS system and was published by Nintendo.

The Malgrave Incident (2011)
Mystery Case Files: The Malgrave Incident was released on June 27, 2011, and is the second game in the Mystery Case Files franchise to be published by Nintendo. Mystery Case Files: The Malgrave Incident is playable for the Wii.

Spirits of Blackpool (2013)
Mystery Case Files: Spirits of Blackpool was released on October 24, 2013, and is the first title in the Mystery Case Files franchise to be published for iOS. It was first released on the Canadian App Store and is playable for the Apple iPad.

Novel series
A four-novel mini series of books was distributed by Harlequin, and written by Jordan Gray.

References

External links

Mystery video games
Detective video games
Big Fish Games games
Casual games
Adventure games
Hidden object games
Video game franchises
Video game franchises introduced in 2005
Video games developed in Serbia